Why? (stylized as why?) is the fifth children's album (and eighteenth overall) from New York City-based alternative rock band They Might Be Giants, released on November 27, 2015. It is composed largely of releases from the band's 2015 Dial-A-Song project.

Release
Why? was released on November 27, 2015. After several children's albums released through the Disney Sound label in the 2000s, this album was released on the band's own Idlewild Recordings. The Disney-released albums all had a theme, such as the alphabet, numbers, and science; this album was intended as a follow-up to the band's first children's album, No!, from 2002, and therefore had no overarching topic. "Or So I Have Read" was the first single from the album, released in October 2015.

A few of the songs had been released before. "And Mom and Kid" was written for the HBO documentary A Family Is a Family Is a Family: A Rosie O'Donnell Celebration. "Then the Kids Took Over" was written for the HBO documentary Saving My Tomorrow, but was extended and re-recorded for this album.

Track listing

Personnel
They Might Be Giants
John Flansburgh – vocals, guitars, etc.
John Linnell – vocals, keyboards, woodwinds, etc.
are joined by
 Marty Beller – drums, percussion
 Danny Weinkauf – bass, vocals on #10
 Dan Miller – guitars
 Robin Goldwasser – vocals on #1 and #11

Production
 Pat Dillett – co-producer, mixing
 Melissa Jun – design
 Alison Cowles – illustrations

References

External links
 Why? at This Might Be A Wiki

2015 albums
Idlewild Recordings albums
They Might Be Giants albums
Albums produced by Pat Dillett
Lojinx albums
Children's music albums by American artists
Kindie rock albums